Jack Andrew Lowden (born 2 June 1990) is a British actor. Following a four-year stage career, his first major international onscreen success was in the 2016 BBC miniseries War & Peace, which led to starring roles in feature films.

Lowden starred as Eric Liddell in the 2012 play Chariots of Fire in London. In 2014, he won an Olivier Award and the Ian Charleson Award for his role as Oswald in Richard Eyre's 2013 adaptation of Ibsen's Ghosts. In 2013, he began to have substantial roles in British television series and feature films, including The Tunnel (2013) and '71 (2014), and had leading roles in the BBC miniseries The Passing Bells (2014) and War & Peace (2016).

His screen projects since War & Peace have included the title role as golfing legend Tommy Morris in Tommy's Honour (2016), the starring role of Morrissey in the biopic England Is Mine (2017), a main-cast role as an RAF fighter-pilot in Christopher Nolan's Dunkirk (2017), a starring role in the Scottish Highlands thriller Calibre (2018, for which he won the British Academy Scotland Award for Best Film Actor), Lord Darnley in Mary Queen of Scots (2018), a starring role as a plantation owner in 19th-century Jamaica in the 2018 BBC miniseries The Long Song, and Zak "Zodiac" Bevis in the 2019 comedy-drama WWE film Fighting with My Family.

Early life
Lowden was born in Chelmsford, Essex, the son of Gordon and Jacquie Lowden. He grew up in the Scottish village of Oxton. In a 2019 interview, he explained: "I'm an IVF baby. And so is my brother. Down there [England] was one of the few places that was doing it." His younger brother, Calum, became a ballet dancer from a very early age at the Manor School of Ballet in Edinburgh, and later trained at the English National Ballet School and the Royal Ballet School in London; as of 2016, he is a first soloist at the Royal Swedish Ballet. As a child, Jack attended the dance classes at Manor School of Ballet as well, but found he was better at, and more suited to, acting. He has stated that his personal ambition since childhood was actually to be a footballer.

When he was 10, Lowden's parents enrolled him in the Scottish Youth Theatre in Edinburgh. At age 12, he played John in a Peter Pan pantomime at the King's Theatre, Edinburgh. He attended Earlston High School, where he starred as Buddy Holly in Buddy – The Buddy Holly Story and performed in various concerts. His conviction to become a professional actor came from seeing the play Black Watch on its first run in 2007. While in high school, he studied during summer school at the Royal Academy of Dramatic Arts in London. He also performed regularly at the Galashiels Amateur Operatic Society, where he played the lead in a 2008 production of The Boy Friend. Lowden received a BA in acting from the Royal Scottish Academy of Music and Drama in Glasgow in 2011.

Career

2009–2011
In 2009, at the age of 18, Lowden starred in a television advertisement for Irn-Bru, sending up High School Musical. In 2010 he had a small part as the character Nick Fairclough on an episode of the Glasgow-set television series Being Victor.

In 2010–11 Lowden was the lead character, Cammy, in the National Theatre of Scotland's revival production of the Olivier Award-winning play Black Watch. The play is an incisive and topical look at the harsh reality of war, and depicts soldiers of the legendary historic Scottish Black Watch regiment serving in Iraq. He and the rest of the cast underwent grueling physical training during the rehearsals period to get into military shape.

The Black Watch production toured to London (Barbican), Glasgow, Aberdeen, and Belfast, and in the U.S. to New York City, Washington, Chicago, Austin, and Chapel Hill. UK reviewers deemed Lowden "a clearly hugely promising young actor" "who carries off this amazing start to his career with assurance and maturity". In the U.S., The Washington Post described him as "quietly charismatic" and a "stand-out"; this was echoed by the Chicago Sun-Times, which called him "easily charismatic"; and the Chicago Tribune noted his "rich and finely detailed work".

2012–2015

From 9 May 2012 to 5 January 2013, Lowden starred as Scottish runner and missionary Eric Liddell in Chariots of Fire, the stage adaptation of the film of the same name. The Olympic-themed play, created and produced specifically in honour of the 2012 London Summer Olympics, opened at London's Hampstead Theatre and transferred to the Gielgud Theatre in the West End in June 2012. Lowden's performance was widely praised, including by Libby Purves in The Times.

Onscreen, in 2012 he appeared in the ITV drama Mrs Biggs as Alan Wright, who has an affair with Charmian Biggs and gets her pregnant. In 2013, he played the pivotal role of the lead character's son, Adam, in the television series The Tunnel. The series is a British/French crime-drama co-production, and aired in the UK and in France; in the summer of 2016 it aired on PBS in the U.S. He also had a sizable role as a young British soldier in the 2014 film '71, which takes place in Belfast in 1971 during the Northern Ireland conflict.

In 2014, Lowden received both the Olivier Award for Best Actor in a Supporting Role, and also the Ian Charleson Award, for his role as Oswald in Richard Eyre's adaptation of Ibsen's Ghosts. The production ran from September 2013 to March 2014, opening at the Almeida Theatre and then transferring in December to the West End at Trafalgar Studios. A filmed February 2014 performance of the production screened in more than 275 UK and Irish cinemas on 26 June 2014. The entire filmed performance is viewable online.

In June 2014 Screen Daily named Lowden one of the UK Stars of Tomorrow.

He performed Orestes in Electra at the Old Vic in the autumn of 2014. The production starred Kristin Scott Thomas as his sister Electra, and Diana Quick played their mother Clytemnestra. Previews began 22 September, the official opening was 1 October, and the run continued in a limited engagement through to 20 December 2014.

On television, he starred as one of the two leads in the 2014 World War I BBC drama series The Passing Bells. It is the story of two youths, one from Germany and one from the UK, who enlist as soldiers at the beginning of the war.

2016–present
Lowden portrayed Nikolai Rostov, one of the main characters, in the 2016 BBC miniseries War & Peace. The 6-part miniseries, which was broadcast around the world and positively reviewed, garnered Lowden the most exposure he had had thus far in his career.

In film, he played the title role in Tommy's Honour (2016), about legendary Scottish golfing champion Old Tom Morris, played by Peter Mullan, and his complex and bittersweet relationship with his son Tom "Tommy" Morris, Jr.; Lowden was nominated for  Best Film Actor at the 2016 BAFTA Scotland Awards for his performance. He also portrayed British politician Tony Benn  in a supporting role in A United Kingdom, a 2016 film about Seretse Khama and Ruth Williams Khama. In another supporting role, he was one of star Rachel Weisz's character's attorneys in Denial (2016), a fact-based legal-drama film about Holocaust denial which also starred Andrew Scott.

In April 2016, he was a finalist in the entertainment category at the 11th Young Scot Awards. In November 2016 the UK arts and entertainment magazine The List featured Lowden as one of The Hot 100 2016.

He played a Royal Air Force fighter pilot, one of the leading roles, in Christopher Nolan's WorldWarII film Dunkirk, released in July 2017. And he portrayed Morrissey in a biopic of the singer titled England Is Mine, written and directed by Mark Gill; the film, which co-stars Jessica Brown Findlay, premiered at the closing gala of the Edinburgh International Film Festival on  2 July 2017 and went into wide release in August 2017.

He co-starred with Martin McCann in a Scottish thriller, Calibre (2018), which began filming in November 2016, debuted at the 2018 Edinburgh International Film Festival, and was released globally on Netflix on 29 June 2018. Guy Lodge in Variety wrote of his performance, "[A] lead performance of through-the-wringer commitment by rising Scots star Jack Lowden. ... An Olivier Award-winning stage actor now settling into a quietly potent, empathetic screen presence, Lowden impressively holds it together through all these key changes, even when his character emphatically does not." Lowden won the 2018 British Academy Scotland Award for Best Film Actor for the performance.
 
On stage, from 28 September to 24 November 2018, Lowden starred opposite Hayley Atwell in Shakespeare's Measure for Measure, at the Donmar Warehouse in London, directed by Josie Rourke. It was a unique gender-reversal production of the work, and he and Atwell alternated the roles of Angelo and Isabella during the play. On television, in December 2018 he co-starred with Tamara Lawrance and Hayley Atwell, in a three-part BBC adaptation of Andrea Levy's novel The Long Song, about a slave on a sugar plantation in 19th-century Jamaica; the piece was filmed on location in the Dominican Republic.

He portrayed Lord Darnley in Mary Queen of Scots (2018), opposite Saoirse Ronan and directed by theatre director Josie Rourke, and Zak "Zodiac" Bevis in the 2019 comedy-drama WWE film Fighting with My Family, opposite Florence Pugh and directed by Steve Merchant. He appeared as FBI agent Crawford in the Al Capone biopic Capone (2020), starring his Dunkirk co-star Tom Hardy.

In February 2019, Lowden teamed up with Beta Cinema to form his own production company, Reiver Pictures, based in Edinburgh. This led to the production of a psychological thriller, Kindred, in which Lowden also starred alongside Tamara Lawrance and Fiona Shaw. His most recent project is that of portraying Siegfried Sassoon in the 2022 biopic Benediction.

Personal life
From 2019 to 2021, Lowden resided in Leith, Edinburgh, before moving back to his native Scottish Borders in May 2021. He is an outspoken supporter of Scottish independence.

Since 2018, he has been in a relationship with Irish actress Saoirse Ronan, his co-star in Mary Queen of Scots.

Filmography

Film

Television

Theatre credits

Awards and nominations

References

External links

May 2012 BBC Radio 4 interview (2:20 to 13:00)
3-minute video segment from 2014 performance in Ibsen's Ghosts
Ghosts co-star and fellow Olivier winner Lesley Manville on Jack Lowden (April 2014)
Profile in Interview (April 2017)
"From Dunkirk To Morrissey, Jack Lowden On Being The One To Watch RN" (InStyle, 31 July 2017)

1990 births
People from the Scottish Borders
Living people
People educated at Earlston High School
21st-century Scottish male actors
Alumni of the Royal Conservatoire of Scotland
Scottish male stage actors
Scottish male film actors
Scottish male television actors
Ian Charleson Award winners
Laurence Olivier Award winners
Chopard Trophy for Male Revelation winners